The 16th Annual World Music Awards was held on September 15, 2004 at the Thomas & Mack Center in Las Vegas, Nevada, USA, outside of Monaco for the first time. Awards are given based on worldwide sales figures for that year.

Winners

2004 Act
World's Best Male Artist: Usher 
World's Best Female Artist: Norah Jones
World's Best Group: Outkast

Pop
World's Best Pop Male Artist: Usher 
World's Best Pop Female Artist: Norah Jones 
World's Best Pop Group: Outkast

Pop/Rock
World's Best Pop/Rock Artist: Avril Lavigne

Rock
World's Best Rock Artist: Evanescence

R&B
World's Best R&B Male Artist: Usher
World's Best R&B Female Artist: Alicia Keys

Rap/Hip-Hop
World's Best Rap/Hip-Hop Artist: Outkast

New
World's Best New Female Artist: Hilary Duff 
World's Best New Male Artist: Kanye West 
World's Best New Group: Maroon 5

Chopard Diamond Award
The Diamond Award honors those incredibly successful recording-artists who have sold over 100 million albums during their career. This is the third year that this award was presented; the first was in 2001.
Celine Dion

Outstanding Contribution to the Music Industry Award
Clive Davis

Regional Awards
World's Best-selling Artist/Australia: Delta Goodrem
World's Best-selling Artist/Canada: Avril Lavigne
World's Best-selling Artist/United Kingdom: Dido 
World's Best-selling Artist/Ireland: Westlife 
World's Best-selling Artist/Greece: Haris Alexiou
World's Best-selling Artist/Netherlands: DJ Tiesto 
World's Best-selling Artist/Ukraine: Ruslana 
World's Best-selling Artist/Russia: Philip Kirkorov 
World's Best-selling Artist/Germany: Sarah Connor 
World's Best-selling Artist/Middle East: Latifa 
World's Best-selling Artist/Scandinavia: The Rasmus 
World's Best-selling Artist/Italy: Eros Ramazzotti 
World's Best-selling Artist/Switzerland: DJ Bobo 
World's Best-selling Artist/Spain: Alejandro Sanz 
World's Best-selling Artist/France: Kyo 
World's Best-selling Artist/China: Jay Chou 
World's Best-selling Artist/Japan: Hikaru Utada

References

World Music Awards, 2004
Lists of World Music Award winners
World Music